Shyam Saran (born 4 September 1946) is an Indian career diplomat. He joined the Indian Foreign Service in 1970 and rose to become the Foreign Secretary to the Government of India. Prior to his appointment as the Foreign Secretary he served as India's ambassador to Myanmar, Indonesia and Nepal and as its High Commissioner to Mauritius. Upon finishing his tenure as the Foreign Secretary, he was appointed the Prime Minister’s Special Envoy for Indo-US Civil Nuclear Issues and later as Special Envoy and Chief Negotiator on Climate Change.

Until 2015, Shyam Saran was the Chairman of the National Security Advisory Board under the National Security Council. He also served as the Chairman of Research and Information System for Developing Countries — an autonomous think tank specializing in studies on economic and trade related issues. He regularly comments and speaks on politics and foreign policy issues and is a contributor to multiple magazines and newspapers.

In 2011, in recognition of his contribution to the civil service, he was awarded the Padma Bhushan - third highest civilian honor in India.

Early career
He joined the Indian Foreign Service in 1970 and subsequently served in different capacities in the Indian diplomatic missions in several capitals of the world including Beijing, Tokyo and Geneva.  Prior to his appointment as the Foreign Secretary, he was India’s Ambassador to Myanmar, Indonesia and Nepal and High Commissioner to Mauritius. In the Ministry of External Affairs, New Delhi, he headed the Economic Division and the Multilateral Economic Division and also headed the East Asia Division which handles relations with China and Japan. As a Joint Secretary in the Prime Minister’s Office in 1991/92, he advised the Prime Minister on foreign policy, nuclear and defense related issues. As foreign secretary and later as the special envoy on nuclear issues, he made a significant contribution to the Indo-US nuclear deal.

Foreign Secretary

China
As foreign secretary, he visited China in March 2005 for the 15th meeting of the India-China Joint Working Group on the boundary issue.

Stance on nuclear weapons
In April 2006, he said that India has no obligation to define its minimum credible nuclear-deterrent after United States Assistant Secretary of State Richard Boucher suggested that India "further define" its minimum deterrent. During his tenure, Saran helped negotiate the U.S.–India Civil Nuclear Agreement. In December 2012, he wrote a research article in which, he pointed out that Pakistan's nuclear arsenal expansion has been extended, this time, not to deter India but to deter possible American attack on Pakistan.

Later career
Even though the Prime Minister's Office was willing to extend his tenure as foreign secretary when he was set to retire in September 2006, Amb. Saran did retire. He was an advisor to the Prime Minister specializing in nuclear issues, as well as the Indian envoy on climate change. He quit office on 19 February 2010. He was the Chairman of the Research and Information System for Developing Countries (RIS) thinktank and a Senior Fellow at the Centre for Policy Research in New Delhi.
He is also on the Advisory Board of World Development Forum, an upcoming forum that aims to bring together citizens' groups, development organizations, businesses and governments, to a common platform to produce, evidence-based politically actionable guidance and unlock greater value, through human enterprise. Additionally, Saran is a Member of the Board of Advisors of the Global Panel Foundation, a respected NGO that works behind the scenes in crisis areas around the world.

Bibliography

Essays and reporting

Books
How India Sees The World: Kautilya To The 21st Century.

See also
Navtej Sarna
Vikas Swarup
Taranjit Singh Sandhu
Harsh Vardhan Shringla

References

External links

 Profile on website of Ministry of External Affairs of India

Indian civil servants
Living people
Ambassadors of India to Nepal
1997
Ambassadors of India to Indonesia
Indian Foreign Secretaries
1946 births
Recipients of the Padma Bhushan in civil service
High Commissioners of India to Mauritius
Indian Foreign Service officers
20th-century Indian politicians